The 1992 Currie Cup Central A was the second division of the Currie Cup competition, the premier domestic rugby union competition in South Africa. This was the 54th season since the competition started in 1889.

Teams

Changes between 1991 and 1992 seasons
  were promoted from the 1991 Currie Cup Central B to the Currie Cup Central A.
  were initially relegated from Currie Cup Central A to the 1992 Currie Cup Central B. However, following the merger of all rugby governing bodies in South Africa,  were dissolved and  retained their place in Currie Cup Central A.

Changes between 1992 and 1993 seasons
 None

Competition

There were four participating teams in the 1992 Currie Cup Central A competition. These teams played each other twice over the course of the season, once at home and once away. Teams received two points for a win and one points for a draw. The winner of the Central A competition played off against the winner of the Central B competition for the Bankfin Cup.

In addition, all the Currie Cup Central A teams also played in the 1992 Currie Cup / Central Series.

Log

Fixtures and results

Round one

Round two

Round three

Round four

Round five

Round six

Round seven

Round eight

Final

The winner of the Central A competition played off against the winner of the Central B competition for the Bankfin Cup.

  won the 1992 Bankfin Cup.

Relegation play-offs

As a result of the play-offs,  remained in the Currie Cup Central A for 1993, while  remained in the Currie Cup Central B for 1993.

See also
 1992 Currie Cup
 1992 Currie Cup / Central Series
 1992 Currie Cup Central B
 1992 Currie Cup Central / Rural Series
 1992 Currie Cup Rural A & B
 1992 Currie Cup Rural B
 1992 Lion Cup

References

A
1992